Diren Akdemir (born 4 February 1985) is a Turkish-Swiss football defender who plays for FC Vaduz in the Swiss Super League.

Career 
He played at youth level for FC Basel and in 2005 joined FC Vaduz.

He has played for Vaduz in the UEFA Cup.

References 

1985 births
Living people
Swiss men's footballers
FC Basel players
FC Vaduz players
Swiss expatriate footballers
Swiss expatriate sportspeople in Liechtenstein
Expatriate footballers in Liechtenstein
FC Wil players
Swiss people of Turkish descent
Swiss expatriates in Liechtenstein
Footballers from Basel
Association football defenders